William Robert Boon FRS FRSC (20 March 1911 – 28 October 1994) was a British chemist, known for developing the herbicide paraquat.

Early life
He was educated at St Dunstan's College and King's College London (BSc; PhD).

Career

ICI
He developed Bipyridine compounds (4,4'-Bipyridine) in 1954 at ICI's Jealott's Hill Experimental Station (Plant Protection Limited) at Jealott's Hill (Warfield) in Berkshire (Bracknell Forest). These compounds are known as Paraquat-Gramoxone and Diquat, being released onto the market in 1958.

Awards
He was awarded the Mullard Award of the Royal Society in 1972 and was made a Fellow of the Royal Society in 1974. He was also a Fellow of the Royal Society of Chemistry and a Fellow of King's College London.

References

1911 births
1994 deaths
Alumni of King's College London
British chemists
Fellows of King's College London
Fellows of the Royal Society
Fellows of the Royal Society of Chemistry
Imperial Chemical Industries people
People educated at St Dunstan's College
Pesticides in the United Kingdom